Mary and Martha is a 2013 British-American television film starring Hilary Swank and Brenda Blethyn, and directed by Phillip Noyce. Based on a screenplay by Richard Curtis, it was produced by Working Title Television, in association with the BBC and NBCUniversal. The film had its UK premiere on 1 March 2013 on BBC One and premiered in the US on HBO on 20 April 2013. The film is based on a true story. The film centers around two mothers, one British, one American, who share only one thing in common: the loss of their sons to malaria. After the deaths of their sons, the mothers decide to travel to Africa to help with malaria prevention. The film was nominated for the Humanitas Prize.

Plot
The film tells the story of two very different women, Mary (Hilary Swank) and Martha (Brenda Blethyn), who both lose their sons to malaria.

Mary is an overly protective American mother. After her young son and only child, George (Lux Haney-Jardine), is bullied by classmates, she decides to pull him out of school and take him on an extended trip to Africa because she feels she can give him a better education. While there, he is bitten by a mosquito, contracts malaria, and dies. In the midst of grieving, Mary decides to return to Africa after George's funeral where she meets Martha, a British woman whose grown son, Ben (Sam Claflin), has also just died of the same disease while working at an orphanage in Mozambique. He too was an only child.

The two women turn their grief into action, hoping to thwart the disease, which the World Health Organization estimates killed 660,000 people in 2010, most of them African children. The movie builds to a scene in which the women testify before a Congressional subcommittee.  In the process, Mary and Martha come to realise that the losses experienced by two comfortable white Western households are atypical, and that the real impact of malaria is on parts of the world that few people in their circles know or care about.

Cast
 Hilary Swank as Mary
 Brenda Blethyn as Martha
 Lux Haney-Jardine as George
 Frank Grillo as Peter
 Bongo Mbutuma as Pumelele
 Nokuthula Ledwaba as Micaela
 Sam Claflin as Ben
 James Woods as Tom
 Ian Redford as Charles
 Kagiso Lediga as Kumi
Sifiso Sihlangu as Little Paul
 Zethu Dlomo as Patience
 Katleho Ramaphakela as African Doctor
 Beatrice Miller as Funeral Singer
 Mangaliso Ngema as Mozambican Doctor
 Melissa Ponzio as Alice
 Sean O'Bryan as Senator
 Stephanie Faracy as Head of Committee
 Elaine Nalee as Senator's Secretary
Simone White as Tracy
Chandler McIntyre as Hannah
Stephen Jennings as Principal
Adam Neill as Teacher
 Peter Jurasik as Pastor
Dominika Jablonska as Pilates Teacher
Theopain Mofokeng as Extra

Reception
Upon its broadcast, the film received positive reviews from critics. Brian Lowry from Variety felt that "Mary and Martha harks back to when the service was content to tell great little stories – often with an agenda – that might not have been commercial enough to find a home elsewhere [...] Admittedly, Curtis has a rather facile view of how good can be accomplished, but in a cynical age, there's something refreshing about old-fashioned idealism, even if the movie hinges on well-intentioned Westerners bringing relief to the Third World. Part of that has to do with the intensely personal approach to the story, and the palpable anguish Swank and Blethyn convey." Neil Genzlinger, writer for The New York Times, wrote that "this movie grabs for every heartstring in sight" and added, "also detracting from the story is that the movie has too much Mary and not enough Martha. So much effort goes into setting up Ms. Swank's somewhat annoying character for a fall that Ms. Blethyn's more interesting character is given short shrift. But the scenes in which the two actresses are together have some real power."

Critical with the film, The A.V. Clubs Simon Abrams wrote that "at first, the off-the-cuff insensitivity that Mary and Marthas characters persistently exhibit seems benign enough. Mary and Martha is, after all, a made-for-TV melodrama about two mothers that bond after their respective sons die from malaria, and grief does sometimes manifest itself in strange ways. Screenwriter Richard Curtis and director Phillip Noyce do their best to, in the words of Hilary Swank's Mary, "tell you how it feels to have a personal involvement with malaria." But while Curtis makes a point of making characters show their grief by gingerly stepping on each other's toes, Mary and Martha is more of a product of unwitting creative insensitivity than an apt reflection of it."

References

External links
 
 
 

2013 television films
2013 films
HBO Films films
Films directed by Phillip Noyce
American television films
American drama films
2010s American films
2010s British films
British drama television films